Linda King FRSB is a virologist in the UK.  She is Professor of Virology and Pro Vice-Chancellor for Research and Global Partnerships at Oxford Brookes University.

Education and career 
King was a student at the University of Liverpool graduating with a BSc in Biochemistry and Cell Biology, she studied for her doctorate in molecular virology at the University of Oxford graduating in 1985 and then worked as a postdoctoral researcher and junior research fellow at Linacre College. The following year she moved to Oxford Brookes to work as a lecturer in virology and subsequently rose to professor in 1998.

Research 
King's research looks at insect viruses and focusses on baculovirus expression systems and their use in protein production.

In 1992 she wrote a book with Robert Possee, The Baculovirus Expression Vector System: A Laboratory Guide.

In 2006 King co-founded Oxford Expression Technologies, a spin out company of Oxford Brookes and NERC, which uses a Baculovirus-based protein expression platform to develop mammalian virus vaccines. In 2020 the company is involved in development of 'Covax-19', a vaccine against COVID-19.

References

External links 
 Oxford Brookes profile

Living people
Year of birth missing (living people)
Fellows of the Royal Society of Biology
British virologists
Women virologists
21st-century British scientists
21st-century British women scientists